Diabetic retinopathy (also known as diabetic eye disease), is a medical condition in which damage occurs to the retina due to diabetes mellitus. It is a leading cause of blindness in developed countries.

Diabetic retinopathy affects up to 80 percent of those who have had both type 1 and type 2 diabetes for 20 years or more. In at least 90% of new cases, progression to more aggressive forms of sight threatening retinopathy and maculopathy could be reduced with proper treatment and monitoring of the eyes. The longer a person has diabetes, the higher his or her chances of developing diabetic retinopathy. Each year in the United States, diabetic retinopathy accounts for 12% of all new cases of blindness. It is also the leading cause of blindness in people aged 20 to 64.

Signs and symptoms

Nearly all people with diabetes develop some degree of retina damage ("retinopathy") over several decades with the disease. For many, that damage can only be detected by a retinal exam, and has no noticeable effect on vision. Over time, progressive retinal damage may appear on a retinal exam, first with small bulges in retinal blood vessels called microaneurysms. Then larger abnormalities in retinal vessels: cotton wool spots, hemorrhages, lipid deposits called "hard exudates", intraretinal microvascular abnormalities, and abnormal-looking retinal veins. Eventually, many progress to a stage where new blood vessels grow throughout the retina. These new blood vessels often break and bleed. Minor bleeding can cause dark floating spots obstructing vision; major bleeding can completely block vision. 

Around half of people with diabetic retinopathy develop swelling of the macula, called macular edema, which can begin at any time. If the swelling occurs near the center of the macula, it can cause vision disruptions ranging from mildly blurred vision to severe loss of the center of an affected person's visual field. Left untreated, around 30% of those with such swelling experience vision disruption over the next 3–5 years. Macular edema is the most common cause of vision loss in people with diabetic retinopathy.

The repeated processes of blood vessel growth, swelling, and scarring can eventually cause retinal detachment, which manifests as the sudden appearance of dark floating spots, flashes of light, or blurred vision.

Diagnosis and classification
Diabetic retinopathy is typically diagnosed by retinal exam observations using ophthalmoscopy. The American Academy of Ophthalmology divides diabetic retinopathy into five categories of progressive severity. The first category, "no apparent retinopathy", describes those with a healthy retinal exam. The next three categories: mild, moderate, and severe nonproliferative diabetic retinopathy (NPDR) describe increasing levels of damage to the retina. People with mild NPDR have microaneurysms in the retina, but no other damage. Those with severe NPDR have 20+ retinal hemorrhages in each quadrant of the retina, a distinctive pattern of damage on the veins of the retina called "venous beading" in at least two retinal quadrants, and obvious intraretinal microvascular abnormalities anywhere on the retina. Moderate NPDR is defined as more severe than mild NPDR, but not yet meeting the criteria for severe NPDR. The fifth stage, proliferative diabetic retinopathy, is for those with new blood vessels forming throughout the retina ("retinal neovascularization"), or blood leaking into the vitreous humor ("vitreous hemorrhage") or between the vitreous membrane and retina ("preretinal hemorrhage").

The same guidelines separately divide macular edema into two categories: "macular edema apparently absent" and "macular edema apparently present". The latter is further subdivided into "mild"—retinal thickening or lipid deposits far from the macula's center; "moderate"— thickening or deposits near the center; and "severe"—thickening or deposits on the macula center. Optical coherence tomography is frequently used to assess macular edema.

Fluorescein angiography is used by retina specialists to further assess diabetic retinopathy severity and to determine sites of macular damage.

Screening
Due to the lack of symptoms, most people with diabetic retinopathy are unaware that they have the condition until they visit an eye doctor.

Both the American Diabetes Association (ADA) and the International Council of Ophthalmology  (ICO) recommend regular eye exams for those with diabetes to screen for diabetic retinopathy (excepting those with gestational diabetes). The ADA recommends a comprehensive eye examination at the time of type 2 diabetes diagnosis, and within five years of the onset of type 1 diabetes. For women with diabetes who become pregnant, the ADA recommends an eye examination before pregnancy, in each trimester, and for a year post partum.

The ICO recommends eye examinations for those with diabetes include a visual acuity examination and a retinal examination via ophthalmoscopy or retinal photography.

Iceland, Ireland, and the United Kingdom are the only countries with full national diabetic retinopathy screening programs, while substantial regional screening programs have been implemented in parts of mainland Europe, parts of Asia, and Botswana. In the UK, screening for diabetic retinopathy is part of the standard of care for people with diabetes. After one normal screening in people with diabetes, further screening is recommended every year. Teleophthalmology has been employed in these programs.

Causes
Diabetic retinopathy is caused by prolonged high blood glucose damaging the small blood vessels of the retina.

Risk factors
The major risk factors for developing diabetic retinopathy are duration of diabetes, poor blood sugar control, and to a lesser extent high blood pressure. Five years after diabetes diagnosis, around 25% of those with type 1 diabetes have some degree of diabetic retinopathy, while 2% have proliferative diabetic retinopathy. By 15 years after diagnosis, that increases to 80% with some retinopathy, and 25% with proliferative disease. Children are an exception—regardless of duration of diabetes, children rarely experience sight-threatening retinopathy; however, puberty can accelerate retinopathy progression. 

Similarly, pregnancy can accelerate the progression of diabetic retinopathy (although women with gestational diabetes are not at risk).

Both chronically high blood sugar (measured by a high HbA1c) and highly variable blood sugar are associated with developing diabetic retinopathy. Several more minor risk factors also exacerbate diabetic retinopathy, namely kidney disease, abnormal blood lipids, high body mass index, and smoking.

Genetic predisposition to diabetic retinopathy in type 2 diabetes consists of many genetic variants across the genome that are collectively associated with diabetic retinopathy (polygenic risk) and overlaps with genetic risk for glucose, low-density lipoprotein cholesterol, and systolic blood pressure. Several variations in the VEGFC gene have also been associated with an increased risk of developing macular edema.

People with Down syndrome, who have extra chromosome 21 material, almost never acquire diabetic retinopathy. This protection appears to be due to the elevated levels of endostatin, an anti-angiogenic protein, derived from collagen XVIII. The collagen XVIII gene is located on chromosome 21.

Incidence of Retinitis Pigmentosa is observed to result in fewer and less severe microvascular lesions in both humans and mouse models. Retinitis Pigmentosa results in loss of rod receptors in the mid peripheral field, reducing the oxygen consumption that is linked with release of VEGF and growth of unwanted blood vessels in the retina.

Obstructive sleep apnea (OSA) has been associated with a higher incidence of diabetic eye disease due to blood desaturation caused by intermittent upper airway obstructions. Treatment for OSA can help reduce the risk of diabetic complications.

Pathogenesis

Diabetic retinopathy is the result of damage to the small blood vessels and neurons of the retina. The earliest changes leading to diabetic retinopathy include narrowing of the retinal arteries associated with reduced retinal blood flow; dysfunction of the neurons of the inner retina, followed in later stages by changes in the function of the outer retina, associated with subtle changes in visual function; dysfunction of the blood-retinal barrier, which protects the retina from many substances in the blood (including toxins and immune cells), leading to the leaking of blood constituents into the retinal neuropile. Later, the basement membrane of the retinal blood vessels thickens, capillaries degenerate and lose cells, particularly pericytes and vascular smooth muscle cells. This leads to loss of blood flow and progressive ischemia, and microscopic aneurysms which appear as balloon-like structures jutting out from the capillary walls, which recruit inflammatory cells; and advanced dysfunction and degeneration of the neurons and glial cells of the retina. The condition typically develops about 10–15 years after receiving the diagnosis of diabetes mellitus.

An experimental study suggests that pericyte death is caused by blood glucose persistently activating protein kinase C and mitogen-activated protein kinase (MAPK), which, through a series of intermediates, inhibits signaling through platelet-derived growth factor receptors—signaling that supports cellular survival, proliferation, and growth. The resulting withdrawal of this signaling leads to the programmed cell death (apoptosis) of the cells in this experimental model.

In addition, excessive sorbitol in diabetics is deposited on retina tissue and it is also proposed to play a role in diabetic retinopathy.

A genetic study showed that diabetic retinopathy shares a similar genetic predisposition with levels of glucose, low-density lipoprotein cholesterol, and systolic blood pressure, indicating that glycemic control and cardiometabolic factors may be important in the development of diabetic retinopathy.

Management
There are four common treatments for diabetic retinopathy: anti-VEGF injections, steroid injections, panretinal laser photocoagulation, and vitrectomy. Current treatment regimens can prevent 90% of severe vision loss.

Although these treatments are very successful (in slowing or stopping further vision loss), they do not cure diabetic retinopathy. Caution should be exercised in treatment with laser surgery since it causes a loss of retinal tissue. It is often more prudent to inject triamcinolone or anti-VEGF drugs. In some patients it results in a marked increase of vision, especially if there is an edema of the macula.

In addition, standard treatment for diabetic retinopathy includes improving control of blood sugar, blood pressure, and blood cholesterol, all of which can reduce diabetic retinopathy progression.

Nonproliferative diabetic retinopathy
Injection of anti-VEGF drugs or steroids can reduce diabetic retinopathy progression in around half of eyes treated; however, whether this results in improved vision long term is not yet known. For those with mild to moderate nonproliferative diabetic retinopathy, the American Academy of Ophthalmology recommends only more frequent retinal exams—every six to twelve months—as these people are at an increased risk of developing proliferative retinopathy or macular edema.

Laser photocoagulation

Laser photocoagulation can be used in two scenarios for the treatment of diabetic retinopathy. Firstly, It can be used to treat macular edema which was common before eye injections were introduced. and secondly, it can be used for treating whole retina (panretinal photocoagulation) for controlling neovascularization. It is widely used for early stages of proliferative retinopathy. There are different types of lasers and there is evidence available on their benefits to treat proliferative diabetic retinopathy.

Panretinal laser photocoagulation
For those with proliferative or severe non-proliferative diabetic retinopathy, vision loss can be prevented by treatment with panretinal laser photocoagulation. 

The goal is to create 1,600–2,000 burns in the retina with the hope of reducing the retina's oxygen demand, and hence the possibility of ischemia. It is done in multiple sittings.

In treating advanced diabetic retinopathy, the burns are used to destroy the abnormal new blood vessels that form in the retina. This has been shown to reduce the risk of severe vision loss for eyes at risk by 50%.

Before using the laser, the ophthalmologist dilates the pupil and applies anaesthetic drops to numb the eye. In some cases, the doctor also may numb the area behind the eye to reduce discomfort. The patient sits facing the laser machine while the doctor holds a special lens on the eye. The physician can use a single spot laser, a pattern scan laser for two dimensional patterns such as squares, rings and arcs, or a navigated laser which works by tracking retinal eye movements in real time. During the procedure, the patient will see flashes of light. These flashes often create an uncomfortable stinging sensation for the patient. After the laser treatment, patients should be advised not to drive for a few hours while the pupils are still dilated. Vision will most likely remain blurry for the rest of the day. Though there should not be much pain in the eye itself, an ice-cream headache like pain may last for hours afterwards.

Patients will lose some of their peripheral vision after this surgery although it may be barely noticeable by the patient. The procedure does however save the center of the patient's sight. Laser surgery may also slightly reduce colour and night vision.

A person with proliferative retinopathy will always be at risk for new bleeding, as well as glaucoma, a complication from the new blood vessels. This means that multiple treatments may be required to protect vision.

Medications

Intravitreal triamcinolone acetonide
Triamcinolone is a long acting steroid preparation. Treating people with DME with intravitreal injections of triamcinolone may lead to a some degree of improvement in visual acuity when compared to eyes treated with placebo injections. When injected in the vitreous cavity, the steroid decreases the macular edema (thickening of the retina at the macula) caused due to diabetic maculopathy, and that may result in an increase in visual acuity. The effect of triamcinolone is not permnanent and may last up to three months, which necessitates repeated injections for maintaining the beneficial effect. Best results of intravitreal Triamcinolone have been found in eyes that have already undergone cataract surgery. Complications of intravitreal injection of triamcinolone may include cataract, steroid-induced glaucoma, and endophthalmitis.

Intravitreal anti-VEGF
Those with diabetic macular edema benefit from regular injections with anti-VEGF antibodies like ranibizumab, bevacizumab, and aflibercept. There is no widely accepted dosing schedule, though people typically receive more frequent injections during the first year of treatment, with less frequent injections in subsequent years sufficient to maintain remission. 

A 2017 systematic review update found moderate evidence that aflibercept may have advantages in improving visual outcomes over bevacizumab and ranibizumab, after one year. In cases with vitreous hemorrhage, however, anti-VEGF injections proved to be less effective in restoring visual acuity than vitrectomy combined with panretinal laser-photocoagulation. Present recommended treatment for diabetic macular edema is multiple injections of anti-VEGF drugs sometimes combined with Modified Grid laser photocoagulation. Sustained delivery systems for anti-VEGF medications can reduce the chances of endophthalmitis development by reducing the number of intravitreal injections necessary for treatment.  Hydrogels have shown great promise for this platform.

Topical medications 
There is little evidence for the role of topical medications in the treatment of macular edema, for example, topical non‐steroidal anti‐inflammatory agents.

Surgery
Instead of laser surgery, some people require a vitrectomy to restore vision. A vitrectomy is performed when there is a lot of blood in the vitreous. It involves removing the cloudy vitreous and replacing it with a saline solution.

Studies show that people who have a vitrectomy soon after a large hemorrhage are more likely to protect their vision than someone who waits to have the operation. Early vitrectomy is especially effective in people with insulin-dependent diabetes, who may be at greater risk of blindness from a hemorrhage into the eye.

Vitrectomy may be done under general or local anesthesia. The doctor makes a tiny incision in the sclera, or white of the eye. Next, a small instrument is placed into the eye to remove the vitreous and insert the saline solution into the eye.

Patients may be able to return home soon after the vitrectomy, or may be asked to stay in the hospital overnight. After the operation, the eye will be red and sensitive, and patients usually need to wear an eyepatch for a few days or weeks to protect the eye. Medicated eye drops are also prescribed to protect against infection. There is evidence which suggests anti-VEGF drugs given either prior to or during vitrectomy may reduce the risk of posterior vitreous cavity haemorrhage. Vitrectomy is frequently combined with other modalities of treatment.

Epidemiology
Around 34.6% of people with diabetes have some kind of diabetic retinopathy, with around 7% experiencing proliferative diabetic retinopathy, 7% diabetic macular edema, and 10% experiencing loss of vision from diabetic retinopathy. Diabetic retinopathy is the leading cause of vision loss in those 20–74 years old.

The global burden of diabetic retinopathy increased dramatically from 1990 to 2015—from 1.4 million to 2.6 million people with visual impairment; from 0.2 million to 0.4 million blinded—due in large part to the increasing burden of type 2 diabetes in low- and middle-income countries.

Diabetic retinopathy is more common in those with type 1 diabetes than type 2.

Research
Several large multicenter randomized clinical trials have been done to evaluate treatment protocols for those with diabetic retinopathy, namely the Early Treatment for Diabetic Retinopathy Study, Diabetic Retinopathy Vitrectomy Study,  Diabetic Retinopathy Study, Diabetes Control and Complications Trial, UK Prospective Diabetes Study, and the Diabetic Retinopathy Clinical Research Network Protocols I, S, and T.

Light treatment 
A medical device comprising a mask that delivers green light through the eyelids while a person sleeps was under development in 2016. The light from the mask stops rod cells in the retina from dark adapting, which is thought to reduce their oxygen requirement, which in turn diminishes new blood vessel formation and thus prevents diabetic retinopathy.  As of 2016 a large clinical trial was underway. As of 2018, the results from the clinical trial showed no long-term therapeutic benefit from using the mask in diabetic retinopathy patients.

C-peptide
C-peptide had shown promising results in treatment of diabetic complications incidental to vascular degeneration. Creative Peptides, Eli Lilly, and Cebix all had drug development programs for a C-peptide product. Cebix had the only ongoing program until it completed a Phase IIb trial in December 2014 that showed no difference between C-peptide and placebo, and it terminated its program and went out of business.

Stem cell therapy
Clinical trials are under way or are being populated in preparation for study at medical centers in Brazil, Iran and the United States. Current trials involve using the patients' own stem cells derived from bone marrow and injected into the degenerated areas in an effort to regenerate the vascular system.

Blood pressure control
A Cochrane review examined 15 randomized controlled trials to determine whether interventions that sought to control or reduce blood pressure in diabetics had any effects of diabetic retinopathy. While the results showed that interventions to control or reduce blood pressure prevented diabetic retinopathy for up to 4–5 years in diabetics, there was no evidence of any effect of these interventions on progression of diabetic retinopathy, preservation of visual acuity, adverse events, quality of life, and costs.

Fundoscopic image analyses 

Diabetic retinopathy is diagnosed entirely by recognizing abnormalities on retinal images taken by fundoscopy. Color fundus photography is mainly used for staging the disease. Fluorescein angiography is used to assess the extent of retinopathy that aids in treatment plan development. Optical coherence tomography (OCT) is used to determine the severity of edema and treatment response.

Because fundoscopic images are the main sources for diagnosis of diabetic retinopathy, manually analyzing those images can be time-consuming and unreliable, as the ability of detecting abnormalities varies by years of experience. Therefore, scientists have explored developing computer-aided diagnosis approaches to automate the process, which involves extracting information about the blood vessels and any abnormal patterns from the rest of the fundoscopic image and analyzing them.

See also 
 Diabetic diet
 Diabetic papillopathy
 Purtscher's retinopathy, a disease with similar abnormalities in the eye, usually caused by trauma.
 Retinal regeneration

References

Works cited

 This article incorporates text from a publication in the public domain:

Further reading

External links 
 Diabetic retinopathy resource guide courtesy of National Eye Institute, National Institutes of Health (NEI/NIH)
 Diabetic Eye Disease National Institute of Diabetes and Digestive and Kidney Diseases, National Institutes of Health (NIDDK/NIH)
 NHS Diabetic Eye Screening Programme

Diabetes
Blindness
Disorders of choroid and retina